Khlystov or Hlystov (from хлыст meaning whip) is a Russian masculine surname, its feminine counterpart is Khlystova or Hlystova. It may refer to
Denis Khlystov (born 1979), Russian ice hockey player
Nikita Khlystov (born 1993), Russian ice hockey player
Nikolay Khlystov (1932–1999), Russian ice hockey player